Wuestneia is a genus of fungi within the Melanconidaceae family.

The genus was circumscribed by Bernhard Auerswald ex Karl Wilhelm Gottlieb Leopold Fuckel in Arch. Vereins Freunde Naturgesch. Mecklenburg vol,13 on page 177 in 1859 (Secondary Literature).

The genus name of Wuestneia is in honour of Karl Georg Gustav Wüstnei (1810–1858), who was a German teacher and also botanist and Entomologist. He taught Mathematics and Natural Sciences in schools in Schwerin, Germany.

Species
As accepted by Species Fungorum;

 Wuestneia acericola 
 Wuestneia beltsvillensis 
 Wuestneia campanulata 
 Wuestneia chrysostroma 
 Wuestneia epispora 
 Wuestneia eucalyptorum 
 Wuestneia fusca 
 Wuestneia guajavae 
 Wuestneia karwarrae 
 Wuestneia molokaiensis 
 Wuestneia paucispora 
 Wuestneia punctistoma 
 Wuestneia tetraspora 

Former species;
 W. aurea  = Wuestneia chrysostroma
 W. compta  = Cryptosporella compta, Gnomoniaceae
 W. farinosa  = Harknessia farinosa, Harknessiaceae
 W. hypodermia  = Cryptosporella hypodermia, Gnomoniaceae
 W. karvarrae  = Wuestneia karwarrae
 W. fibrosa  = Diaporthe fibrosa
 W. sphinctrina  = Anthostoma dryophilum, Diatrypaceae
 W. stilbostoma  = Melanconis stilbostoma, Melanconidaceae
 W. suffusa  = Cryptosporella suffusa, Gnomoniaceae
 W. tessera  = Diaporthe tessera
 W. xanthostroma  = Wuestneia chrysostroma
 W. xanthostroma var. dearnessii  = Wuestneia chrysostroma

References

External links
Wuestneia at Index Fungorum

Melanconidaceae